Inside the Games (also known as insidethegames and insidethegames.biz) is an Olympic news website edited by the British sports journalist Duncan Mackay.

Mackay launched the site in 2005, originally as insidethegames.com, following the announcement that London has been chosen to host the 2012 Summer Olympics. The name of the site was changed to insidethegames.biz in 2009.

Inside the Games is based in Bletchley, near Bletchley Park.

Mackay was a winner of the 2009 Internet writer of the year award at the British Sports Journalism Awards by the Sports Journalists' Association  for his work on insidethegames.

The insidethegames site was involved in a court litigation in 2010 with Zulu Creative, a web design company previously used by insidethegames.

The site is currently published by Dunsar Media. In addition to the Olympics, the site now covers Paralympics, Commonwealth Games, and a variety of other sporting events. Inside the Games forms official media partnerships with the organizers of some of the sporting events that it covers.

References

External links
insidethegames.biz, Inside the Games website

British sport websites